Mièges is a commune in the Jura department in Bourgogne-Franche-Comté in eastern France. On 1 January 2016, the former communes of Esserval-Combe and Molpré were merged into Mièges.

Population

See also 
 Communes of the Jura department

References 

Communes of Jura (department)